Second officer is a civil aviation rank, also known as junior first officer. It is used for pilots at an early stage of their career.

Modern airliners only require two pilots, the captain and the first officer. Before a pilot is fully qualified to operate as first officer, they will typically act as a second officer, sitting in the right hand seat, while undergoing training and supervision from a training captain. A safety pilot will sit in the jump seat to monitor the junior first officer and the captain.

In some airlines, a second officer is not permitted to take off or land the aircraft, and will only fly the aircraft during the cruise.

At Singapore Airlines and Scoot, second officers are usually promoted to first officer after 5-8 months.

Usage

Airlines which use the title "second officer" include:

Cathay Pacific
China Eastern Airlines
Lufthansa
Singapore Airlines
Volotea

Historically, the second officer was the flight engineer. This is a trained pilot who does not fly the aircraft, but instead monitors aircraft systems. Modern airliners only require two pilots, and do not have a flight engineer or a navigator.

See also 
 Pilot in command
 Second mate
 Third officer (aviation)

References 

Occupations in aviation